Econo Lodge is an economy motel chain based in the United States and Canada. Econo Lodge is one of the larger brands in the Choice Hotels system. It aims to provide affordable rooms to budget travelers. The properties contain a minimum of 40 guest rooms and are often located near highways or highway access. All hotels provide a free breakfast.

, there are 779 Econo Lodge hotels open with 46,992 rooms. There are Econo Lodge motels in every US state and Canadian province.

History 

The company began in Norfolk, Virginia by developer Vernon Myers and his son, Vernon Jr. in 1969 as Econo-Travel and they were joined by Lloyd , a local businessman.

 took on the project, finding investors and money, as well as doing extensive market research, to see if the concept would work. The chain's mascot in the early days was "Sandy", a girl in a short Scotch skirt and tam. The first hotel, still operating at 865 North Military Highway in Norfolk, was built for $275,000. Its daily rate for rooms was $7 single, $9 double, and $11 for four. 

 sold the chain, which had 306 locations, in 1983 for $836 million. He had begun to change the name on all locations to Econo Lodge in the latter 1970s. The brand went through ups and downs and a number of owners after the founders sold out. It fell into the hands of investor Paul Wallace, whose fund bought the brand, refurbished it, mended relations with franchisees, and then sold it to what is now Choice Hotels International in 1990. It is the more upscale of the group's economy brands; its sister brand, Rodeway Inn, usually has fewer amenities.

See also
 List of motels

References

External links

Econo-Travel Motor Hotel Directory – Fall, Winter 1974/1975

Motels in the United States
Motels in Canada
Companies based in Norfolk, Virginia
Hotels established in 1969
Choice Hotels brands
American companies established in 1969
1969 establishments in Virginia